Wild Things is a nature conservation organization based in the Chicago area that organizes one of the largest volunteer-led nature conservation conferences in the United States.

The Wild Things Conference 
Every two years, Wild Things hosts the Wild Things Conference, a massive meeting of nature-lovers from all walks of life, from all around the world. The first Wild Things Conference was in 2005. During the event, the organization hosts seminars and presentations on:

Advocacy/Constituency Building/Communication
Arts/Culture/History
Backyards/Neighborhoods/Urban Environment
Birds/Bird Conservation
Ecological Land Management and Restoration
Ecological Monitoring/Research
Natural History of the Chicago Region
Sustainability/Climate Change
Tools for Educators
Volunteers/Stewardship/Community Engagement
Water and Aquatic Ecosystems
Youth Stewardship

Art exhibitions are also hosted as part of the conference.

References

External links 
 Official community website

Organizations based in Chicago
Environmental organizations based in Chicago